was a town located in Akaiwa District, Okayama Prefecture, Japan.

As of 2003, the town had an estimated population of 8,854 and a density of 193.61 persons per km2. The total area was 45.73 km2.

On March 7, 2005, Kumayama, along with the towns of Akasaka, San'yō and Yoshii (all from Akaiwa District), were merged to create the city of Akaiwa.

Dissolved municipalities of Okayama Prefecture
Akaiwa, Okayama